Monroe Ward is a historic neighborhood in Downtown Richmond. It is East of the Fan district and includes several apartment buildings, usually with VCU students living in them. Recently, VCU expanded its Monroe Park campus into the Monroe Ward with the Engineering East/Snead Hall building, as well as an under construction residence hall and parking deck. The historic Jefferson Hotel is located in the Monroe Ward. The culture-filled area is situated between the Fan area and Downtown.

Downtown Richmond
National Register of Historic Places in Richmond, Virginia